The big-eared swamp rat (Malacomys longipes) is a species of rodent in the family Muridae. It is found in sub-Saharan Africa from Nigeria to Kenya and south to Zambia and Angola. Its natural habitat is subtropical or tropical moist lowland forests.

References

 Van der Straeten, E. & Dieterlen, F. 2004.  Malacomys longipes.   2006 IUCN Red List of Threatened Species.   Downloaded on 9 July 2007.

Malacomys
Mammals described in 1877
Taxonomy articles created by Polbot